The U.S. state of North Carolina is divided into 1,035 townships in 100 counties.

See also
 North Carolina
 List of cities and towns in North Carolina
 List of North Carolina counties

References

External links
 National Association of Towns and Townships

 
Townships
North Carolina